Pervomayskoye is a rural locality (a selo) in Sevsky District, Bryansk Oblast, Russia. The population was 325 as of 2010. There are 5 streets.

Geography 
Pervomayskoye is located 15 km southwest of Sevsk (the district's administrative centre) by road. Polyana is the nearest rural locality.

References 

Rural localities in Sevsky District